The Feeling's Not Right Again is a collection of previously recorded songs by Ray Stevens, released in 1979.  All of the selections were chosen from his studio albums that were recorded for Warner Bros. Records. Stevens had a total of five singles released by Warner Bros., but only three are featured on this collection; the rest of the selections are album tracks. The first track, "I Need Your Help Barry Manilow," is a novelty single that made its first album appearance on this collection; both it and the title track are homages to singer-songwriter Barry Manilow, and the album's cover art is itself a spoof of Manilow's album Tryin' to Get the Feeling. "I Need Your Help Barry Manilow" was a minor hit for Stevens, narrowly missing the top 40 of the Billboard Hot 100 (Stevens's last appearance on the chart to date) and reaching #11 on the adult contemporary music charts.

Track listing

Album credits
Arranged and Produced by: Ray Stevens
Recorded at Ray Stevens' Studio, Nashville

Charts
Singles - Billboard (North America)

References

1979 compilation albums
Ray Stevens compilation albums
Warner Records compilation albums